Waropen may be,

Waropen Regency
Waropen language